Eleni Zafeiriou (1916 – 2 September 2004) was a Greek film actress.  She appeared in 108 films between 1951 and 1996. She was born in Larissa, Greece, and died in Athens.

Filmography

In film

 Bitter Bread (1951)
 Dead City (1951)
 I Agni tou limaniou (1951)
 Madame X (1954) - Rosa
 A girl in black (1956) - Froso
 I kafetzou (1956) - Anna Giavassi
 The Aunt from Chicago (1957) Efterpi Barda
 A Matter of Dignity (1957)
 The Lake of Thinking (1958)
 Zalongo, to kasto tis lefterias (1959) - Javelaina
 Romance Stories (1959) - Smaragdi
 I limni ton stenagmon (1959) - Vagia
 Stratiotes dichos stoli (1960) - Martha
 The Downhill (1961) - Elisavet Nikolaou
 Law 4000 (1962) - Anna Ikonomou
 Glory Sky (1962)
 Anisicha niata (193) - Lena
 Despoinis diefnytis (1964) - Loukia Samiotaki
 Egoism (1964) - Maria
 The First Love (1964)
 I gymni taxiarchia (1965) - Sofia
 Me pono kai dakrya (1965) - Maria
 Perifrona me glykia mou (1965) - Despoina
 Kardia mou papse na ponas (1965) - as Theia
 Jenny Jenny (Jenny-Jenny) (1966) - Matina Skoutari
 Dokimassia (1955) - Eleni Moraitou
 O anthropos pou gyrise apo ton pono (1966) - Irini Liossi
 The Windy House (1966) - Nina Iordanidou
 Kapote klaine lai oi dynatoi (1967) - Angeliki
 The Husband from London (1967) - Eleni
 Ta dolaria tis Aspasias (1967) - Aspasia
 I archontissa kai o alitis (1968) - a mother
 Afti pou de lygise (1968) - Maria
 Tapeinos kai katafronemenos (1968) - Maria Kanava
 Xerizomeni genia (1968) - Fani Karatzoglou
 I kardia enos aliti (1968) - Katerina Sarri
 Wake Up, Vassilis (1969) - Antigoni Vassilaki
 The Last Goodbye (1969)
 Gia tin timi kai ton erota (1969) - Klada
 Enas andras me syneidisi (1969) - Tasia
 I odysseia enos xerizomenou (1969) - Fani Karatzoglou
 Ftochogeitonia agapi mou (1969) - Riga, grandma
 The Refugee (1959) - Despoina Skoutari
 Esena monon agapo (1970) - mitera
 Ipolochagos Natassa (1970) - a mother of Natassa
 Astrapogiannos (1970) - Zachari
 Men Know How to Love (1970) - Amalia
 Agapissa enan aliti (1971)
 Pros tin eleftheria (1996)

In television
Dona Rosita (1984)
The Third Crown (1995, ANT1)
The Colour of the Moon (1996–97, ANT1)

References

External links

1916 births
2004 deaths
Actors from Larissa
Greek film actresses
Greek stage actresses
20th-century Greek actresses